Burrows Run is a  long 2nd order tributary to Red Clay Creek in New Castle County, Delaware.

Variant names
According to the Geographic Names Information System, it has also been known historically as:  
Barris Run
Burris Run
Burroughs Brook

Course
Burrows Run rises on the Craigs Mill Run divide at Mendenhall in Chester County, Pennsylvania.  Burrows Run then flows south into Delaware to meet Red Clay Creek about 0.25 miles east of Ashland, Delaware.

Watershed
Burrows Run drains  of area, receives about 48.6 in/year of precipitation, has a topographic wetness index of 393.10 and is about 37.5% forested.

See also
List of rivers of Delaware
List of rivers of Pennsylvania

References 

Rivers of Delaware
Rivers of Pennsylvania
Rivers of New Castle County, Delaware
Rivers of Chester County, Pennsylvania